Government House is the official residence of the governor of Anguilla, located in Old Ta in Anguilla.

The building was first constructed in 1969, but was substantially modernised in 1974.

As well as being the residence of the Anguillan Governor and their family, Government House is also used for national and ceremonial functions, as well as receptions and meetings with visiting foreign dignitaries and heads of state. It is also the official residence of the Anguillan head of state (currently King Charles III) when staying in Anguilla.

See also
 Government House - elsewhere in the Commonwealth or British Overseas Territories
 Government Houses of the British Empire and Commonwealth

External links
 Information on Government House from the Anguillan Governor's Office

Official residences
Government Houses of the British Empire and Commonwealth
Buildings and structures in Anguilla
Governors of Anguilla
Buildings and structures completed in 1969